James F. Nagle (November 15, 1927 – March 26, 2019) was an American politician who served in the New York State Assembly from the 135th district from 1977 to 1992.

He died on March 26, 2019, in Fairport, New York at age 91.

References

1927 births
2019 deaths
Republican Party members of the New York State Assembly